A number of vessels of the French Navy have borne the name Var, after the river of that name.

 , in service 1806–1809.

References 

French Navy ship names